This is the discography of Turkish pop singer İzel. She has released 10 studio albums and 1 remix album.

Albums

Remix albums

Production

Guest appearances

References

Discographies of Turkish artists
Discography
Pop music discographies